Expulsion is the most serious form of disciplinary action that can be taken against a Member of Congress. The United States Constitution (Article I, Section 5, Clause 2) provides that "Each House [of Congress] may determine the Rules of its proceedings, punish its members for disorderly behavior, and, with the concurrence of two-thirds, expel a member." The processes for expulsion differ somewhat between the House of Representatives and the Senate.

Censure, a less severe form of disciplinary action, is an official sanction of a member. It does not remove a member from office.

Process leading to expulsion
Presently, the disciplinary process begins when a resolution to expel or censure a Member is referred to the appropriate committee. In the House, this is the Committee on Ethics (House Ethics Committee); in the Senate, this is the Select Committee on Ethics (Senate Ethics Committee).

The committee may then ask other Representatives or Senators to come forward with complaints about the Member under consideration or may initiate an investigation into the Member's actions. Sometimes Members may refer a resolution calling for an investigation into a particular Member or matter that may lead to the recommendation of expulsion or censure.

Rule XI (Procedures of committees and unfinished business) of the Rules of the House of Representatives states that the Committee on Standards of Official Conduct can investigate allegations that a Member violated "any law, rule, regulation, or other standard of conduct applicable to the conduct of such Member ... in the performance of his duties or the discharge of his responsibilities". The Senate Select Committee on Ethics has the same jurisdiction. The committee may then report back to their whole chamber as to its findings and recommendations for further actions.

When an investigation is launched by either committee, an investigatory subcommittee will be formed. Once the investigatory subcommittee has collected evidence, talked to witnesses, and held an adjudicatory hearing, it will vote on whether the Member is found to have committed the specific actions and then will vote on recommendations. If expulsion is the recommendation then the subcommittee's report will be referred to the full House of Representatives or Senate where Members may vote to accept, reject, or alter the report's recommendation. Voting to expel requires the concurrence of two-thirds of the members. This is set out in Article 1, Section 5, Clause 2 of the United States Constitution.

Expulsions from Congress

In the entire history of the United States Congress, 20 Members have been expelled: 15 from the Senate and five from the House of Representatives. Seventeen of these 20 were expelled for supporting the Confederate States in 1861 and 1862. One member's expulsion, Senator William K. Sebastian of Arkansas, was posthumously reversed. Censure has been a much more common form of disciplinary action in Congress over the years, as it requires a much lower threshold of votes to impose.

Other initiations of actions to expel 
There have been numerous other attempts to expel members of Congress. In many of those instances members under serious threat of expulsion resigned, including:

 1862: Senator James F. Simmons, Republican of Rhode Island. On July 14, 1862, the Judiciary Committee reported that the charges of corruption against Simmons were "essentially correct"; The Senate adjourned three days later, and Simmons resigned on August 15 before the Senate could take action.
 1906: Senator Joseph R. Burton, Republican of Kansas. Resigned after the Supreme Court upheld his conviction on charges of receiving compensation for intervening with a federal agency.
 1922: Senator Truman H. Newberry, Republican of Michigan. On March 20, 1920, Newberry was convicted on charges of violating campaign finance laws by spending $3,750 to secure his Senate election. The Supreme Court overturned this decision on May 2, 1921, on the grounds that the Senate exceeded its powers in attempting to regulate primary elections. On January 12, 1922, the Senate voted 46-41 that Newberry was duly elected in 1918. However, after certain members resumed their efforts to unseat him, Newberry resigned on November 18, 1922, two days before the start of the third session of the 67th Congress.
 1981: Representative Raymond F. Lederer, Democrat of Pennsylvania, was the only member of the Abscam scandal to win re-election. However he resigned due to "personal legal problems" a week after the House Ethics Committee recommended his expulsion for accepting a $50,000 bribe.
 1982: Senator Harrison A. Williams, Democrat of New Jersey, resigned after the Committee on Ethics recommended his expulsion due to his "ethically repugnant" actions in the Abscam scandal.
 1995: Senator Bob Packwood, Republican of Oregon, resigned after the Committee of Ethics recommended his expulsion due to his gross sexual misconduct and his attempts to enrich himself through his official position.
 2006: Representative Bob Ney, Republican of Ohio, resigned after being convicted in connection with the Jack Abramoff scandals.

There were other instances in which investigations were brought, but the defendants were exonerated, expulsion was rejected, insufficient evidence was found, or the member's term expired:

 1808: Senator John Smith, Democratic-Republican of Ohio, was implicated in the Aaron Burr-led conspiracy to invade Mexico and create a new country in the west. Senator John Quincy Adams of Massachusetts led the attempt to expel Smith from the Senate while Francis Scott Key defended Smith before the Senate. Expulsion failed 19 to 10, less than the two-thirds majority needed. At request of the Ohio Legislature, Smith resigned two weeks after the vote.
 1856: Congressman Preston Brooks, Democrat of South Carolina, beat Senator Charles Sumner with a cane. For this incident, he avoided expulsion but resigned; he was then re-elected by the people of South Carolina, who considered him a hero.
 1862: The expulsion of Senator Lazarus W. Powell, Democrat of Kentucky, was sought for support for Confederate rebellion. Unlike the three Senators expelled for that reason the same year and the eleven Senators the previous year, Powell was not expelled.
 1873: Senator James W. Patterson, Republican of New Hampshire, was accused of corruption, and a Senate select committee recommended expulsion on February 27. On March 1, a Republican caucus decided that there was insufficient time remaining in the session to deliberate the matter. Patterson's term expired March 3, and no further action was taken.
 1893: Senator William N. Roach, Democrat of North Dakota, was accused of embezzlement that had allegedly occurred 13 years earlier. After extensive deliberation, the Senate took no action, assuming that it lacked jurisdiction over members' behavior before their election to the Senate.
 1905: Senator John H. Mitchell, Republican of Oregon, was indicted on corruption charges on January 1, 1905, and was convicted on July 5 of that year, during a Senate recess. He died on December 8, while his case was still on appeal and before the Senate, which had convened on December 4, could take any action against him.
 1907: Senator Reed Smoot, Republican of Utah, a leader in the LDS Church, was the subject of a two-year investigation by the Committee on Privileges and Elections, which found that Smoot was not due his seat in the Senate because he was "a leader in a religion that advocated polygamy which is contrary to the U.S. Constitution." Smoot's expulsion failed by a vote of 27-43 after the Senate decided that he fit the constitutional requirements to be a Senator.
 1919: Senator Robert M. La Follette, Sr., Republican of Wisconsin, was accused of disloyalty after a 1917 speech he gave in opposition to U.S. entry into World War I. The Committee on Privileges and Elections recommended that La Follette not be expelled and the Senate concurred in a 50–21 vote.
 1924: Senator Burton K. Wheeler, Democrat of Montana, was indicted for conflict of interest, specifically acting as a lawyer, while a senator, in cases in which the U.S. was a party. A Senate committee, however, found that his dealings related to litigation before state courts and that he received no compensation for any service before federal departments. The Senate exonerated him by a vote of 56–5.
 1934: The Committee on Privileges and Elections, jointly considering the case of Senators John H. Overton, Democrat, and Huey P. Long, Democrat, both of Louisiana, determined that the evidence to support charges of election fraud were insufficient to warrant further consideration.
 2021: Representative Jimmy Gomez, Democrat of California, introduced a resolution to expel Representative Marjorie Taylor Greene, Republican of Georgia, for supporting QAnon and other right-wing conspiracy theories, as well as being accused of being complicit in planning and inciting the Capitol storming, and her refusal to recognize Joe Biden as the 46th President of the United States. Seventy-two Democrats supported the resolution, but the Democratic Speaker of the House, Nancy Pelosi, did not.

See also
 Federal impeachment in the United States
 List of federal political scandals in the United States
 List of United States senators expelled or censured
 List of United States representatives expelled, censured, or reprimanded
 Resignation from the United States Senate

References

Further reading 

Maskell, Jack. "Expulsion, Censure, Reprimand, and Fine: Legislative Discipline in the House of Representatives", Congressional Research Service, April 16, 2002.
Maskell, Jack. "Recall of Legislators and the Removal of Members of Congress from Office", Congressional Research Service, March 20, 2003.
"Senate History on Expulsion and Censure."
Sorokin, Ellen. "In Congress' 213-year history, expulsion 'exceedingly rare'", The Washington Times, July 25, 2002.